IBM System R is a database system built as a research project at IBM's San Jose Research Laboratory beginning in 1974.  System R was a seminal project: it was the first implementation of SQL, which has since become the standard relational data query language. It was also the first system to demonstrate that a relational database management system could provide good transaction processing performance. Design decisions in System R, as well as some fundamental algorithm choices (such as the dynamic programming algorithm used in query optimization), influenced many later relational systems.

System R's first customer was Pratt & Whitney in 1977.

See also 
 IBM Db2
 IBM SQL/DS
 Ingres (database)
 SQL
 System/38

References

External links
 .
 .
 .

1974 software
System R
Proprietary database management systems
Relational database management systems